Leather Boyz with Electric Toyz is the debut album from the band Pretty Boy Floyd. It reached #130 on the United States Billboard chart in 1989.  

Although its original release met with modest success,  the album is considered an incredibly influential classic within the glam metal musical community.

It was released on MCA Records, and was produced by Howard Benson, who would go on to have a production career in the 90s and beyond, working with Hoobastank among many others.

There are videos for the songs "Rock And Roll (Is Gonna Set The Night On Fire)", "I Wanna Be with You”.

Track listing
 Leather Boyz with Electric Toyz - 4:48
 Rock and Roll (Is Gonna Set The Night On Fire) - 3:13
 Wild Angels - 5:08
 48 Hours - 2:59
 Toast of the Town* - 3:18
 Rock and Roll Outlaws - 2:33
 Only the Young - 3:51
 The Last Kiss - 2:39
 Your Mama Won't Know - 3:42
 I Wanna Be with You - 3:57

 *This is a cover of a Mötley Crüe song which appeared as the b-side to their debut single, "Stick To Your Guns", released on their Leathür Records label in 1981.

Bonus
The 2003 bonus re-issue featured some extra tracks, a couple of which had been recorded as part of Kristy Majors solo project.
Slam Dunk
She's My Baby
Two Hearts
Over the Edge
I Just Wanna Have Something to Do (Ramones cover)

Limited Edition
A very limited-release 2011 re-issue featured a cover of Department of Youth, by Alice Cooper, originally released on Welcome to my Nightmare in 1975.

Personnel

Pretty Boy Floyd
 Steve "Sex" Summers – lead vocals
 Kristy "Krash" Majors – guitars, backing vocals
 Vinnie Chas – bass, backing vocals
 Kari Kane – drums, backing vocals

Additional musicians
Howard Benson – keyboards
Matt Bradley – vocals
Phil Balvano –	vocals
Jennifer "Miss Frosty" Hoopes, Paris Hampton, Maura Eagan, Candice Gartland, Elizabeth Goldner, Katharine Lundy – backing vocals

Production
Produced By Howard Benson
Recorded, Engineered & Mixed By Howard Benson & Bill Jackson
Assistant Engineers: Brian Stover, Brooke Hendricks, George Schureman, Jeff Chestek, Mike Cohn
Glen LaFerman 	– photography
Paula Janecek – artwork, design, layout design

References

1989 debut albums
Pretty Boy Floyd (American band) albums
Albums produced by Howard Benson
MCA Records albums